History Today, an illustrated magazine published monthly in London since 1951
the journal of the Indian History and Culture Society
 History Today a comedy sketch, see  The Mary Whitehouse Experience or Newman and Baddiel in Pieces